Ritchie Peter Branagan (born 20 October 1991) is a footballer who plays as a goalkeeper. Born in England, he made one appearance for the Republic of Ireland U21 national team.

Club career
Branagan was born in Gravesend, Kent. Having previously been part of the youth system at Bolton Wanderers he joined the youth set-up at Bury. He joined Bury's first team squad for the 2009–10 season and was granted a one-year contract extension in the summer of 2010.

He made his Football League debut on 23 October 2010 as a 60th-minute substitute for the injured Cameron Belford in a match with Southend United. In May 2011 he was offered a new contract by the club. He signed a new 12-month contract with Bury in June 2011. In May 2012, Branagan was released by the club after being deemed surplus to requirements.

In August 2012 he joined Salford City. In August 2013 he signed for Macclesfield Town after a successful trial and made his debut on 2 November 2013 in the FA Cup against Swindon Town.

Following his release from Macclesfield Town he joined Chorley in January 2017 as a replacement for the injured Sam Ashton.

He finished his career at Droylsden after signing for them in 2017.

International career
Branagan made his Republic of Ireland U21 debut in Cyprus in February 2011.

Personal life
He is the son of former Bolton goalkeeper Keith Branagan.

Career statistics

References

External links
 
 

English footballers
Living people
1991 births
Sportspeople from Gravesend, Kent
Association football goalkeepers
Bolton Wanderers F.C. players
Bury F.C. players
Republic of Ireland under-21 international footballers
English Football League players
Salford City F.C. players
Macclesfield Town F.C. players
Droylsden F.C. players
Chorley F.C. players